MLW Never Say Never is a professional wrestling supercard event produced by Major League Wrestling (MLW). The event was first held in 2017 as a television taping for MLW's weekly program, Fusion.

Dates and venues

References

Never Say Never
Recurring events established in 2017